Leslie Bader (born November 10, 1963) is an American speed skater. She competed in four events at the 1988 Winter Olympics.

References

External links
 

1963 births
Living people
American female speed skaters
Olympic speed skaters of the United States
Speed skaters at the 1988 Winter Olympics
People from Monroe, Connecticut
21st-century American women